The Whole Shebang is a 2001 American-Canadian romantic comedy film written and directed  by George Zaloom and starring Stanley Tucci, Bridget Fonda and Giancarlo Giannini.

This movie was Bridget Fonda's final role in a theatrical film to date. She appeared in a couple of television movies after this, and then stopped acting in 2002.

Premise
A man (Stanley Tucci), on a mission to save his family's fireworks business, becomes distracted after he falls in love.

Cast 

 Stanley Tucci as Giovanni Bazinni 
 Bridget Fonda as  Val Bazinni 
 Giancarlo Giannini as  Pop Bazinni 
 Talia Shire as  Countess Bazinni 
 Anna Maria Alberghetti as  Lady Zito 
 Anthony DeSando as  Joey Zito 
 Alexander Milani as  Bobby Bazinni 
 Frederico Fuoco as  Anthony Zito 
 John Cassini as  Pater Jerry 
 Jason Schombing as Ronaldo Bazinni 
 Frank Ferrucci as Arturo Bazinni 
 Jo Champa as  Maria
 Christian Bocher as  Frank Bazinni 
 Maria Luisa Cianni as  Andrea Martelli

References

External links 

 

2001 romantic comedy films
American romantic comedy films
English-language Canadian films
Canadian romantic comedy films
2001 directorial debut films
2001 films
2000s English-language films
2000s American films
2000s Canadian films